1992 in television may refer to:

1992 in American television
1992 in Australian television
1992 in Austrian television
1992 in Belgian television
1992 in Brazilian television
1992 in British television
1992 in Canadian television
1992 in Chinese television
1992 in Danish television
1992 in Dutch television
1992 in German television
1992 in Greek television
1992 in Irish television
1992 in Israeli television
1992 in Japanese television
1992 in Mexican television
1992 in New Zealand television
1992 in Norwegian television
1992 in Philippine television
1992 in Portuguese television
1992 in Scottish television
1992 in South African television
1992 in South Korean television
1992 in Swedish television
1992 in Thai television